The 2012 MTV EMAs (also known as the MTV Europe Music Awards) were held in Frankfurt, Germany, on 11 November 2012. This was the fifth time the awards had been held in Germany, and the second time Frankfurt had been the host city. On 17 August the nominees were announced. Rihanna received eight nominations while Katy Perry and Taylor Swift received five, leading the categories.

This year added new regional categories to compete in the Best Worldwide Act, as well as the Best Look category, due to the presence of the same award at the Italian TRL Awards. Taylor Swift, Han Geng, Justin Bieber and One Direction were the biggest winners taking home three awards each.

Nominations
Winners are in bold text.

Regional nominations
Winners are in bold text.

Europe

Africa, Middle East and India

Asia and Oceania

Latin America

Worldwide Act nominations
Winners are in bold text.

Performances

Appearances
 Louise Roe, Tim Kash and Sway Calloway – Red carpet hosts and presented Biggest Fans
 Lana Del Rey – presented Best Female
 Kim Kardashian – presented Best Song
 Gaz Beadle, Holly Hagan, Sophie Kasaei, Ricci Guarnaccio, Vicky Pattison, Daniel Thomas-Tuck, Jay Gardner and Charlotte Crosby – presented Best Male
 Anne Vyalitsyna, Brett Davern and Isabeli Fontana – presented Best Live Act
 Heidi Klum – presented Best Look
 Alicia Keys – presented Global Icon
 David Hasselhoff – presented Best Video
 Jonas Brothers – presented Best Worldwide Act

See also
2012 MTV Video Music Awards

References

External links
Official Site 

2012
MTV Europe Music Awards
MTV Europe Music Awards
MTV Europe Music Awards
MTV Europe Music Awards, 2012
MTV Europe Music Awards